The Ellicott Square Building is a historic office complex, completed in 1896, located in Buffalo, New York. It is found within the Joseph Ellicott Historic District.

History
The Ellicott Square Building was designed by Charles Atwood of D. H. Burnham & Company, and completed in May, 1896.  At the time of its completion, it was the largest office building in the world.  In 1896 and 1897, the building was the site of Edisonia Hall and the Vitascope Theater, the earliest known dedicated motion picture theater in the world.

It was built at a cost of $3.5 million in less than one year. The building was named after Joseph Ellicott, the planner and surveyor who laid out the then-village of Buffalo.

The mantra of architect Daniel Burnham was "make no little plans, they have no magic to stir men’s blood; think big." Built in the Italian Renaissance style, the exterior of the Ellicott Square Building is made of granite, iron, and terra cotta with a veneer of pearl gray brick. The majestic interior courtyard contains a marble mosaic floor designed by William Winthrop Kent and James A. Johnson. Imported from Italy, the 23 million pieces of marble on the mosaic depict sun symbols from civilizations around the world. The interior court resembles that of the Rookery Building in Chicago.

There are broad stairs on either side and a glass roof in an ornamental steel frame provides natural light. The building features ornate glove lamps, intricate columns, carefully proportioned classical features gracing doorways, marble and brass to trim iron and stone.

The beautiful lobby of the Ellicott Square Building remains a favorite gathering spot for political rallies, weddings and social functions. In 1984 it was used for hotel scenes in the movie The Natural.

The terracotta cornice was removed in 1971, and, soon thereafter, most of the forty lion heads on the exterior were also removed.

The building is currently managed by Ellicott Development Co., the company founded and owned by Carl Paladino.

See also
List of tallest buildings in Buffalo

Notes

External links
Ellicott Square Building at Buffalo as an Architectural Museum
Ellicott Square Building at Emporis.com
Ellicott Square Building at Undercover Tourist

Skyscraper office buildings in Buffalo, New York
Office buildings completed in 1896
Tourist attractions in Buffalo, New York